Environmental analysis is the use of analytical chemistry and other techniques to study the environment.  The purpose of this is commonly to monitor and study levels of pollutants in the atmosphere, rivers and other specific settings. Other environmental analysis techniques include biological surveys or biosurvey, soil analysis or soil test, vegetation surveys and tree identification, and remote sensing which uses satellite imagery to assess the environment on different spatial scales.

Analysis techniques 

Chemical analysis typically involves sampling some part of the environment and using lab equipment to figure out how much of a certain target compound exists. Someone might use chemical analysis to assess pollution levels for remediation, or to make sure groundwater is safe for drinking. Biological surveys typically include a measurement of the abundance of a certain species within a certain area to ascertain information about the ecosystem for specific reasons. Analysis like this could be used in efforts to understand species abundance, or to look at how external effects from the environment are affecting an ecosystem. A soil test may involve chemical analysis, but most often soil tests involve removing a section of soil to understand what each layer of soil is composed of for specific reasons. Soil samples might be needed if someone is determining whether they can build on a certain site, or just to produce a model of an area. A vegetation survey is quite similar to a biosurvey because one is measuring the abundance of plant species and trees within a specific area to understand more about the ecosystem for specific reasons. Sometimes these are done to understand ecological effects from outside factors, or to just determine overall ecosystem health. Remote sensing can be used for environmental analysis by taking imagery shot by satellites in multiple wavelengths to assess areas of different scale for a certain objective. Remote sensing can be used to identify land use, it can be used to determine damages from forest fires, it can be used for weather systems and meteorology, and also for atmospheric composition. Recent advances in remote sensing field has also led to the development of autonomous devices for the analysis of physico-chemical parameters of the environment using sensors.

References

Analytical chemistry
Environmental science